Miss Andy is a 2020 Taiwanese and Malaysian gender-themed film directed by Teddy Chin, and stars Lee Lee-zen, Ruby Lin, and Jack Tan. It is about the chance meeting between an illegal Vietnamese worker and a transgender woman in Malaysia. The film is Ruby Lin's first foray into film production.

The film premiered at the 15th Osaka Asian Film Festival on March 11, 2020. The film was released in Taiwan on January 8, 2021.

Synopsis
Meet Evon, formerly known as Andy. She is a transgender woman aged 55 years. Making the transition late in life after losing a wife, her job and family, she also becomes subject to prejudice in a society where transgender and gay people face job discrimination and run the risk of being murdered. When she loses her best friend, things look bleak, but a chance meeting with a mother and a son with nowhere to go and nobody to care for them after they escape an abusive relationship changes her life in this melancholy yet hopeful film that shows how tending to the humanity in others and showing kindness are important for making life bearable.

Cast
Lee Lee-zen
Ruby Lin
 Jack Tan
 Kyzer Tou
 Keshap Suria
 Sathisvaran Magesvaaran
 Kendra Sow
 Irfani Zhang

Featured songs
 沒顏色的花 (Mei Yan Se De Hua - Colorless Flower) sung by Lala Hsu

Release
 15th Osaka Asian Film Festival (OAFF) - March 11, 2020
 19th New York Asian Film Festival (NYAFF) - August 29, 2020
 Fünf Seen Filmfestival - August 31, 2020
 Taiwan International Queer Film Festival (TIQFF) - October 11, 2020
 The Kaohsiung Film Festival (KFF) - October 31, 2020
 Hong Kong Lesbian and Gay Film Festival (HKLGFF) - November 27, 2020

Accolades

FPP is film project matching platform included meetings and workshop, NOT screening.

References

External links

2020 films
Taiwanese drama films
2020 drama films
Films set in Malaysia
Films shot in Malaysia
Films about trans women
2020 LGBT-related films
Taiwanese LGBT-related films
Malaysian LGBT-related films